is a railway station located in the city of Semboku, Akita Prefecture, Japan, operated by JR East.

Lines
Shōden Station is served by the Tazawako Line, and is located 55.3 km from the terminus of the line at Morioka Station.

Station layout
The station has one side platform serving a single bi-directional track. There is no station building, but only a shelter built on the platform. The station is unattended.

History
Shōden Station opened on July 10, 1955 as a station on the Japan National Railways (JNR) serving the town of Tazawako, Akita. The station was absorbed into the JR East network upon the privatization of the JNR on April 1, 1987.

Surrounding area

See also
 List of Railway Stations in Japan

External links

 JR East Station information 

Railway stations in Japan opened in 1955
Railway stations in Akita Prefecture
Tazawako Line
Semboku, Akita